Sofia Nilda Frometa Leonard (born 28 January 1999) is an Italian racing cyclist, who last rode for UCI Women's Team .

See also
 List of 2018 UCI Women's Teams and riders

References

External links

1999 births
Living people
Italian female cyclists
Place of birth missing (living people)
21st-century Italian women